A rump party is a political party that is formed by the remaining body of supporters and leaders who do not support a breakaway group who merge with or form another new party.
The rump party can have the name of the original party, or a new name.

Examples:
 The pro-protectionism Conservative Party in the UK after the breakaway of the free trade Peelite faction in 1846 over the repeal of the corn laws.
 Conservative Party of British Columbia
 United Labour Party in New Zealand which had a remnant made up of moderates who did not join the new, more radical, Social Democratic Party.
 Liberal Party (UK, 1989)
 Centre Party (Germany)
 National Party (South Africa) under leadership of DF Malan after formation of the United Party.
 New National Party (South Africa), the new name of what remained of National Party under the leadership of FW de Klerk and Marthinus van Schalkwyk.
 Party of the Democratic Left (Slovakia, 2005)
 Progressive Canadian Party, under Ernie Schreiber and now Sinclair Stevens, the remnants of the former Progressive Conservative Party of Canada that opposed the merger with the Canadian Alliance.
 Progressive Conservative Party of Saskatchewan
 The Rassemblement-UMP (Gathering-Union for a Popular Movement) is an ephemeral French legislative group, led by former Prime Minister François Fillon, which split from the Union for a Popular Movement on November 2012 after the internal contestation which followed the election of the party's president. Created on November 27, 2012, this dissident group has been reintegrated in the UMP's parlementary group after negotiations between the two rivals on January 16, 2013.
 Saskatchewan Liberal Party
 Social Democratic Party (UK, 1990–present)
 Social Democratic Party of Hungary

Communist rump parties:
 Brazilian Communist Party
 Communist Party of Britain
 Communist Party of Finland (1994)
 Communist Party of Germany (1990)
 Hungarian Workers' Party

References

Political parties
Types of political parties